Arkaitz Ruiz de Miguel (born 18 July 1989) is a Spanish footballer who plays as a centre forward.

Club career
Born in Navarre, Ruiz graduated from the youth academy of CA Osasuna. He made his senior debut with CD Basconia in 2008–09] season and in the following year, he was promoted to Bilbao Athletic, which competed in the Segunda División B. On 22 July 2011, he signed for CF Sporting Mahones after a season with Polideportivo Ejido.

In December 2011, Ruiz was transferred to Burgos CF in the same division, but at the end of the season, the club was relegated to the Tercera División. He continued his career with the club in Tercera, scoring the winning goal in the promotion play-offs. On 17 July 2013, his contract was renewed, keeping him with the club for another season.

After three seasons with Burgos CF, Ruiz joined Zamora CF on 14 July 2014. In the following two seasons, he went on to represent CD Tudelano and UD Somozas.

In September 2017, Ruiz moved abroad and signed for Hong Kong club Dreams Sports Club, sharing team with fellow Spaniards Pablo Gallardo, José Pedrosa Galán, Nacho Martínez and Joaquin García. On 31 August, he made his debut, scoring the equaliser in a 1–1 draw against Tai Po.

Career statistics

References

External links

Arkaitz Ruiz at Athletic Bilbao website

1989 births
Living people
Spanish footballers
Association football forwards
Segunda División B players
Tercera División players
CD Basconia footballers
Bilbao Athletic footballers
Polideportivo Ejido footballers
CF Sporting Mahonés players
Burgos CF footballers
Zamora CF footballers
CD Tudelano footballers
UD Somozas players
Hong Kong Premier League players
Dreams Sports Club players
Spanish expatriate footballers
Spanish expatriate sportspeople in Hong Kong
Athletic Bilbao footballers